Vinson Massif is a large mountain massif in Antarctica that is  long and  wide and lies within the Sentinel Range of the Ellsworth Mountains. It overlooks the Ronne Ice Shelf near the base of the Antarctic Peninsula. Vinson Massif was discovered in January 1958 by U.S. Navy aircraft. In 1961, the Vinson Massif was named by the Advisory Committee on Antarctic Names (US-ACAN), after Carl G. Vinson, United States congressman from the state of Georgia, for his support for Antarctic exploration. On November 1, 2006, US-ACAN declared Mount Vinson and Vinson Massif to be separate entities. Vinson Massif lies within the Chilean claim under the Antarctic Treaty System.

It was first climbed in 1966 by an American team led by Nicholas Clinch. An expedition in 2001 was the first to climb via the Eastern route, and also took GPS measurements of the height of the peak. As of February 2010, 1,400 climbers have attempted to reach the top of Mount Vinson.

Geography
The Vinson Massif extends between Goodge Col and Branscomb Glacier to the northwest, Nimitz Glacier and Gildea Glacier to the southwest and south, and Dater Glacier and its tributary Hinkley Glacier to the east. The southeastern part of the massif ends at Hammer Col, which joins it to the Craddock Massif, of which the highest point is Mount Rutford.

The current height of Mount Vinson was measured by a GPS survey that was conducted by the 2004 Omega Foundation team comprising Damien Gildea of Australia (leader) and Rodrigo Fica and Camilo Rada of Chile. Since 1998 and continuing through 2007, the Omega Foundation has placed a GPS receiver on the summit for a suitable period of time to obtain accurate satellite readings.

Geology
Steeply inclined strata known as the Crashsite Group forms Vinson Massif. In ascending order, the Crashsite Group is subdivided into the Howard Nunataks Formation, the Mount Liptak Formation, and the Mount Wyatt Earp Formation. Erosion-resistant and steeply inclined beds of the Mount Wyatt Earp Formation comprise the crest of the Vinson Massif, including Mount Vinson. The steeply inclined strata of the Crashsite Group are part of the western limb of a major syncline that forms the core of the Sentinel Range within the Ellsworth Mountains. The Mount Wyatt Earp Formation contains Devonian fossils. The transition beds at the base of the Crashsite Group contain Late Cambrian trilobites. The intervening lower parts of the Crashsite Group likely include Ordovician and Silurian strata.

Climate and glaciers
The climate on Mount Vinson is generally controlled by the polar ice cap's high-pressure system, creating predominantly stable conditions but, as in any polar climate, high winds and snowfall are a possibility. During the summer season, November through January, there are 24 hours of sunlight.

Over successive years, the limited amount of snow that falls on Vinson Massif compacts and is transformed into ice, forming glaciers. These glaciers follow the topography and flow down the mountain's valleys. The uppermost glacier occupies Jacobsen Valley on the north face of Mount Vinson, and flows either into Branscomb Glacier to the west or Crosswell Glacier to the east. The Crosswell Glacier flows into the Rutford Ice Stream via Ellen Glacier. The south face of Mount Vinson is drained by Roché Glacier, which flows westwards into Branscomb Glacier, with the latter leaving Vinson Massif to join Nimitz Glacier.

History
A high mountain, provisionally known as "Vinson", was long suspected to be in this part of West Antarctica, but it was not actually seen until January 1958, when it was spotted by US Navy aircraft from Byrd Station. It was named after Carl Vinson, United States Representative from Georgia who was a key supporter of funding for Antarctic research.

First ascent
In 1963, two groups within the American Alpine Club (AAC), one led by Charles D. Hollister and Samuel C. Silverstein, M.D., then in New York, and the other led by Peter Schoening of Seattle, Washington, began lobbying the National Science Foundation to support an expedition to climb Mount Vinson. The two groups merged in spring 1966 at the urging of the National Science Foundation and the AAC and Nicholas Clinch was recruited by the AAC to lead the merged expeditions. Officially named the American Antarctic Mountaineering Expedition (AAME) 1966/67, the expedition was sponsored by the AAC and the National Geographic Society, and supported in the field by the U.S. Navy and the National Science Foundation Office of Antarctic Programs. Ten scientists and mountaineers participated in AAME 1966/67. In addition to Clinch they were Barry Corbet, John Evans (University of Minnesota), Eiichi Fukushima (University of Washington, Seattle), Charles Hollister, Ph.D. (Columbia University), William Long, (Alaska Methodist University), Brian Marts, Peter Schoening, Samuel Silverstein, (Rockefeller University) and Richard Wahlstrom.

In the months prior to its departure for Antarctica the expedition received considerable press attention, primarily because of the reports that Woodrow Wilson Sayre was planning to fly in a Piper Apache piloted by Max Conrad, the "flying Grandfather", with four companions into the Sentinel Range to climb the Mount Vinson. Sayre had a reputation for problematic trips as a result of his unauthorized, unsuccessful, and nearly fatal attempt to climb Mount Everest from the North in 1962. His unauthorized incursion into Tibet led China to file an official protest with the U.S. State Department. In the end, the purported race did not materialize as Conrad had difficulties with his plane. According to press reports, he and Sayre were still in Buenos Aires on the day the first four members of AAME 1966/67 reached Mount Vinson's summit. 
      
In December 1966 the Navy transported the expedition and its supplies from Christchurch, New Zealand to the U.S. base at McMurdo Sound, Antarctica, and from there in a ski-equipped C-130 Hercules to the Sentinel Range. All members of the expedition reached the summit of Mount Vinson. The first group of four climbers summited on December 18, 1966, four more on December 19, and the last three on December 20.

On August 17, 2006, from nomination by Damien Gildea of the Omega Foundation, US-ACAN approved naming the subsidiary peaks south of Mount Vinson for the AAME 1966/67 members Nicholas Clinch, Barry Corbet, Eiichi Fukushima, Charles Hollister, Brian Marts, Samuel Silverstein, Peter Schoening and Richard Wahlstrom. Other peaks in the Sentinel Range had previously been named for John Evans and William Long.

Later ascents

The climb of Vinson offers little technical difficulty beyond the usual hazards of travel in Antarctica, and as one of the Seven Summits, it has received much attention from well-funded climbers in recent years. Multiple guide companies offer guided expeditions to Mount Vinson, at a typical cost of around US$45,000 per person, including transportation to Antarctica from Chile.

First ascent from east side
While the vast majority of prior climbs to the summit have used the western side of the massif from the Branscomb Glacier, the first ascent from the east side was successfully completed by an eight-person team sponsored by NOVA in January 2001. The team consisted of:
 Conrad Anker – expedition leader
 Jon Krakauer – mountaineer and author
 Dave Hahn        – mountain guide with 34 ascents, including ascents to Gardner,  and Shinn.
 Andrew Mclean    – extreme skier
 Dan Stone        – glaciologist
 Liesl Clark      – producer
 John Armstrong   – cameraman
 Rob Raker        – assistant cameraman and sound recording

The team not only made the first ascent from the east side but also performed scientific research into snow accumulation at different elevations as well as taking the first ground-based GPS reading from the summit.

Another first was the successful aircraft landing of a Twin Otter on the Upper Dater Glacier on the eastern slopes of Mount Vinson.

NOVA named the production "Mountain of Ice", which first aired on PBS in February 2003.

See also
 Vinson Plateau
 Mount Sidley – highest volcano in Antarctica
 Seven Summits

Maps
 Vinson Massif.  Scale 1:250 000 topographic map.  Reston, Virginia: US Geological Survey, 1988.
 D. Gildea and C. Rada.  Vinson Massif and the Sentinel Range.  Scale 1:50 000 topographic map.  Omega Foundation, 2007.
 Antarctic Digital Database (ADD). Scale 1:250000 topographic map of Antarctica. Scientific Committee on Antarctic Research (SCAR). Since 1993, regularly updated.

References

External links

 The Vinson Massif. Explorers Dream

Mountains of Ellsworth Land
Seven Summits
Ellsworth Mountains
Filchner-Ronne Ice Shelf
Four-thousanders of Antarctica